The United States Air Force's 125th Weather Flight (125th WF) is a combat weather team located at Tinker AFB in Oklahoma City, Oklahoma.

Mission
The mission of the 125th WF is to provide strategic meteorological information within an adequate amount of time, after given appropriate notice of changing meteorological elements. Being a combat team, the team's mission also includes five additional primary missions: unconventional warfare, foreign internal defense, special reconnaissance, direct action, and counter-terrorism. Although not specifically a part of the Special Operations Force (SOF) of the United States Army, the 125th Weather Flight does directly support it.

Assignments

Major Command
Air Combat Command (1957 – present)

Bases stationed
Tinker AFB, Oklahoma City, Oklahoma (2002 – present)
Will Rogers World Airport, Oklahoma City, Oklahoma (1973–2002)

Decorations
 Air Force Outstanding Unit Award

References

External links
Oklahoma ANG
AF.mil: Weather Flight Homepage

Weather units of the United States Air Force
Flights of the United States Air Force
Units and formations of the Air National Guard
Military units and formations in Oklahoma